High-throughput sequencing technologies have led to a dramatic decline of genome sequencing costs and to an astonishingly rapid accumulation of genomic data. These technologies are enabling ambitious genome sequencing endeavours, such as the 1000 Genomes Project and 1001 (Arabidopsis thaliana) Genomes Project. The storage and transfer of the tremendous amount of genomic data have become a mainstream problem, motivating the development of high-performance compression tools designed specifically for genomic data. A recent surge of interest in the development of novel algorithms and tools for storing and managing genomic re-sequencing data emphasizes the growing demand for efficient methods for genomic data compression.

General concepts 
While standard data compression tools (e.g., zip and rar) are being used to compress sequence data (e.g., GenBank flat file database), this approach has been criticized to be extravagant because genomic sequences often contain repetitive content (e.g., microsatellite sequences) or many sequences exhibit high levels of similarity (e.g., multiple genome sequences from the same species). Additionally, the statistical and information-theoretic properties of genomic sequences can potentially be exploited for compressing sequencing data.

Base variants 
With the availability of a reference template, only differences (e.g., single nucleotide substitutions and insertions/deletions) need to be recorded, thereby greatly reducing the amount of information to be stored. The notion of relative compression is obvious especially in genome re-sequencing projects where the aim is to discover variations in individual genomes. The use of a reference single nucleotide polymorphism (SNP) map, such as dbSNP, can be used to further improve the number of variants for storage.

Relative genomic coordinates 
Another useful idea is to store relative genomic coordinates in lieu of absolute coordinates. For example, representing sequence variant bases in the format ‘Position1Base1Position2Base2…’, ‘123C125T130G’ can be shortened to ‘0C2T5G’, where the integers represent intervals between the variants. The cost is the modest arithmetic calculation required to recover the absolute coordinates plus the storage of the correction factor (‘123’ in this example).

Prior information about the genomes 
Further reduction can be achieved if all possible positions of substitutions in a pool of genome sequences are known in advance. For instance, if all locations of SNPs in a human population are known, then there is no need to record variant coordinate information (e.g., ‘123C125T130G’ can be abridged to ‘CTG’). This approach, however, is rarely appropriate because such information is usually incomplete or unavailable.

Encoding genomic coordinates 
Encoding schemes are used to convert coordinate integers into binary form to provide additional compression gains. Encoding designs, such as the Golomb code and the Huffman code, have been incorporated into genomic data compression tools. Of course, encoding schemes entail accompanying decoding algorithms. Choice of the decoding scheme potentially affects the efficiency of sequence information retrieval.

Algorithm design choices 
A universal approach to compressing genomic data may not necessarily be optimal, as a particular method may be more suitable for specific purposes and aims. Thus, several design choices that potentially impacts compression performance may be important for consideration.

Reference sequence 
Selection of a reference sequence for relative compression can affect compression performance. Choosing a consensus reference sequence over a more specific reference sequence (e.g., the revised Cambridge Reference Sequence) can result in higher compression ratio because the consensus reference may contain less bias in its data. Knowledge about the source of the sequence being compressed, however, may be exploited to achieve greater compression gains. The idea of using multiple reference sequences has been proposed. Brandon et al. (2009) alluded to the potential use of ethnic group-specific reference sequence templates, using the compression of mitochondrial DNA variant data as an example (see Figure 2). The authors found biased haplotype distribution in the mitochondrial DNA sequences of Africans, Asians, and Eurasians relative to the revised Cambridge Reference Sequence. Their result suggests that the revised Cambridge Reference Sequence may not always be optimal because a greater number of variants need to be stored when it is used against data from ethnically distant individuals. Additionally, a reference sequence can be designed based on statistical properties  or engineered  to improve the compression ratio.

Encoding schemes 
The application of different types of encoding schemes have been explored to encode variant bases and genomic coordinates. Fixed codes, such as the Golomb code and the Rice code, are suitable when the variant or coordinate (represented as integer) distribution is well defined. Variable codes, such as the Huffman code, provide a more general entropy encoding scheme when the underlying variant and/or coordinate distribution is not well-defined (this is typically the case in genomic sequence data).

List of genomic re-sequencing data compression tools 
The compression ratio of currently available genomic data compression tools ranges between 65-fold and 1,200-fold for human genomes. Very close variants or revisions of the same genome can be compressed very efficiently (for example, 18,133 compression ratio was reported  for two revisions of the same A. thaliana genome, which are 99.999% identical). However, such compression is not indicative of the typical compression ratio for different genomes (individuals) of the same organism. The most common encoding scheme amongst these tools is Huffman coding, which is used for lossless data compression.

References

Genomics techniques